Lyman Twining Tingier (June 9, 1862 – April 3, 1920) was an American politician who was the 75th Lieutenant Governor of Connecticut from 1913 to 1915. A Democrat, Tingier ran for the office of governor in 1914.

Tingier was born June 9, 1862, in Webster, Massachusetts, the son of Seymour Allen Tingier and Sarah Jane Twining. After attending public schools in Webster, he studied at the Nichols Academy. In 1888, Tingier graduated from Yale Law School and was admitted to the Connecticut bar. In 1889, he settled in Rockville, Connecticut. In 1893, Tingier married Charlotte Eliza Skinner.

In 1908 and 1910, Tingier was elected to the Connecticut House of Representatives. During his second term, he served on the Judiciary Committee and was selected as Democratic leader of the House. In December 1911, Tingier was also elected mayor of Rockville.

Tingier died at his home in Rockville on April 3, 1920.

References

External links
 https://web.archive.org/web/20071026194408/http://www.cslib.org/agencies/lieutenantgovernor.htm

1862 births
1920 deaths
People from Webster, Massachusetts
Nichols College alumni
Yale Law School alumni
People from Rockville, Connecticut
Democratic Party members of the Connecticut House of Representatives
Mayors of places in Connecticut
Lieutenant Governors of Connecticut